Happy Thoughts is the third comedy album released by comedian Daniel Tosh. The special originally aired on Comedy Central and was released independently on DVD. Daniel Tosh: Happy Thoughts is the follow-up to Tosh's DVD debut, Daniel Tosh: Completely Serious.

Charts

Special features
 Comedy Central aired version
 Encore
 A Day in the Life
 Opening Acts: Jasper Redd and Matt Fulchiron

References

External links

2011 live albums
Image Entertainment live albums